Eastern Carolina League may refer to:

Virginia League, former Minor League Baseball league of 1906–1928
Virginia League (1894–96), former Minor League Baseball league of 1894–1896
Virginia League (1900), former Minor League Baseball league of in 1900
Virginia League (1939–42), former Minor League Baseball league of 1939–1942
Virginia League (1948–51), former Minor League Baseball league of 1948–1951
Virginia League (collegiate baseball), former College Summer Baseball league